Andrei Yuryevich Bulatov (born 1 March 1978) is a Russian professional football coach and a former player.

Club career
He made his debut in the Russian Premier League in 1999 for FC Dynamo Moscow.

In 2000 he graduated from the Moscow Institute of Chemical Technology named after Dmitry Mendeleev.

External links
  Profile at Footballfacts

1978 births
People from Solnechnogorsky District
Living people
Russian footballers
Russia under-21 international footballers
Association football defenders
Russian football managers
FC Dynamo Moscow players
Russian Premier League players
FC Khimki players
D. Mendeleev University of Chemical Technology of Russia alumni
Sportspeople from Moscow Oblast